Wolf Law is a 1922 American silent drama film directed by Stuart Paton and starring Frank Mayo, Sylvia Breamer and Tom Guise.

Cast
 Frank Mayo as Jefferson De Croteau
 Sylvia Breamer as Francine Redney
 Tom Guise as Etienne De Croteau
 Richard Cummings as Enoch Lascar
 William Quinn as Simon Santey
 Nick De Ruiz as Samson Bender
 Harry Carter as 'Dandy' Dawson
 Paul Wismer as Mountaineer

References

Bibliography
 Connelly, Robert B. The Silents: Silent Feature Films, 1910-36, Volume 40, Issue 2. December Press, 1998.
 Munden, Kenneth White. The American Film Institute Catalog of Motion Pictures Produced in the United States, Part 1. University of California Press, 1997.

External links
 

1922 films
1922 drama films
1920s English-language films
American silent feature films
Silent American drama films
Films directed by Stuart Paton
American black-and-white films
Universal Pictures films
1920s American films